Macroglossum lepidum is a moth of the  family Sphingidae. It is known from Malaysia and the Philippines.

References

Macroglossum
Moths described in 1915